LeRoy (also Leroy) is an unincorporated community in northeastern Jackson County, West Virginia, United States.  It lies along Liverpool Road between Reedy and Sandyville, northeast of the city of Ripley, the county seat of Jackson County.  Its elevation is 646 feet (197 m).  Although LeRoy is unincorporated, it has a post office (under the name of Le Roy), with the ZIP code of 25252.

References

Unincorporated communities in Jackson County, West Virginia
Unincorporated communities in West Virginia